Songdo Point ("Pine-Island Cape") is a North Korean headland in the middle of the country's eastern coast along the Sea of Japan. It is located in Sinpo in South Hamgyong province.

Names
Songdo Point is also known by its Korean name Songdo or  During the Japanese occupation of Korea, it was known as

Geography
It has two summits, which can appear to be small islands when observed from a distance. It is the eastern entrance to the Yanghwa Man.

Structures
There is a  lighthouse on Songdo Point which is active but closed to the public. The American National Geospatial-Intelligence Agency notes, however, that "the existence and operation of all navigational aids should be considered unreliable on the east coast of North Korea".

See also
		
 List of lighthouses in North Korea

References

Citations

Bibliography
 .
 .

External links
 , a topographical map of the area around Musu Point.

Headlands of North Korea
Landforms of South Hamgyong
Lighthouses in North Korea